Scoglitti is a fishing village and hamlet of Vittoria, a municipality in the Province of Ragusa, Sicily, Italy. In 2011 it had a population of 4,175.

History
Scoglitti found a niche in history after being selected by the Allies as the site for an amphibious invasion of Sicily made by the US 45th Infantry Division during World War II.

When the invasion went ahead on July 10, 1943, rough seas disorganized the attacking boat waves, and the soft sand was an impediment to movement. However, the location was poorly defended and the Allies were able to consolidate their position in a day or two and move further inland.

Geography
Scoglitti is a seaside village by the Mediterranean Coast. It is 14 km from Vittoria and Santa Croce Camerina, 20 from Marina di Ragusa, 22 from Comiso, 30 from Gela and 30 from Ragusa.

Economy
In addition to its fishing industry, the village derives a substantial part of its income from tourism.

Events
The village hosts a daily fishing auction, and annual events such as the Festival of St Francesco, and the procession of the Virgine di Portosalvo.

 Local craft beer festival

See also
 Cerasuolo di Vittoria (wine)

References

Scoglitti, Ragusa.net website.
Mitcham, Samuel M. and Stauffenberg, Friedrich von (2007): The Battle of Sicily: How the Allies Lost Their Chance, Stackpole Books,  (Extract).

External links

Frazioni of the Province of Ragusa
Vittoria, Sicily